Hans Hansson may refer to:

Sportspeople
 Hans Hansson (ice hockey) (born 1949), Swedish ice hockey player
 Hans Hansson (skier) (1919–2003), Swedish alpine skier
 Hans Hansson (wrestler) (1901–1971), Swedish wrestler
 Hans Hansson (tennis), Australian tennis player

Others
 Hans Hansson i Stocksäter (1893–1978), Swedish politician
 Hans Kristian Hansson (1895–1959), Norwegian jurist and civil servant
 Thors Hans Hansson (born 1950), Swedish physicist

See also 
 Hans Hanson (disambiguation)
 Hans Hansen (disambiguation)
 Hanson (surname)